A flame-bladed sword or wave-bladed sword has a characteristically undulating style of blade. The wave in the blade is often considered to contribute a flame-like quality to the appearance of a sword. The dents on the blade can appear parallel or in a zig-zag manner. The two most common flame-bladed swords are rapiers or Zweihänders. A flame-bladed sword was not exclusive to a certain country or region. The style of blade can be found on swords from modern-day Germany, France, Spain, and Switzerland.

Flambard, Flammard, and Flammenschwert 

The two-handed flame-bladed sword is referred to by the German Flammenschwert (literally "flame-sword"). These swords are very similar to two-handed sword or Zweihänder, the only difference being the blade. The design of the blade is decorative along with being functional by causing unpleasant vibrations while parrying. Still, the undulating blade is no more effective at cutting than a straight one. An advantage over swords with a straight blade is that a waved blade could better distribute the force of impact and thus was less likely to break. It could also threaten the opponent in a duel and may have witheld them of grabbing the blade.  Like other Zweihänders, they were used during the 16th century by the Landsknechts (well-trained and experienced swordsmen) for single-fights, protecting castle/town walls, or sometimes to protect the banner on the battlefield.

Flamberge 
Flamberge is not a fit term to use for flame-bladed swords because of the many different connotations it has. Despite coming from the French "flamber", meaning "flaming", it has been used to refer to swords without the flamed-blade.

Egerton Castle used the term to refer to swords that were a transition from the rapier to the smallsword. These swords did not necesarilly have an undulated blade. Castle makes note of this being the case of certain Swiss rapiers, but flamberge quickly became a disdainful term in France to refer to flamboyant swords. This comes from the French expression "Mettre flamberge au vent", meaning "To put [the sword] in the wind". Here, it is suggested that the wielder of the sword likened it to the mythical sword Durendal, which alternatively was called flamberge.  

The term is a frequent name or alias for swords in medieval chansons de geste and romances. Here, it often just meant a large sword.

Gallery

See also
 Colichemarde blade — a type of robust smallsword blade
 Flaming sword (mythology) — figurative flaming swords in mythology
 Kris — a Southeast Asian bladed weapon with a similar flame-shaped blade

References

External links
 
Renaissance-era swords